Shadows of the Metropolis (German:Schatten der Weltstadt) is a 1925 German silent drama film directed by Willi Wolff and starring Ellen Richter, Alfred Gerasch and Walter Janssen.

The film's sets were designed by the art directors Otto Erdmann and Hans Sohnle. The film survives and has been restored by Friedrich Wilhelm Murnau Foundation.

Cast
 Ellen Richter as Olly Bernard  
 Alfred Gerasch as Henry Bernard, Ihr Mann  
 Walter Janssen as Felix Granier  
 Frida Richard as Graniers Mutter  
 Philipp Manning as Minister  
 Robert Garrison as Emil, genannt Eierkopf  
 Harald Paulsen as Boxer Karl  
 Adolf Klein as Der Gerichtspräsident  
 Hugo Werner-Kahle as Prosecutor
 Karl Platen as Diener bei Bernard

References

Bibliography
 Grange, William. Cultural Chronicle of the Weimar Republic. Scarecrow Press, 2008.

External links

1925 films
Films of the Weimar Republic
Films directed by Willi Wolff
German silent feature films
1925 drama films
German drama films
UFA GmbH films
German black-and-white films
Silent drama films
1920s German films
1920s German-language films